Robert Morford Wood (April 9, 1926 – January 25, 2004) was an American sailor. He competed in the Flying Dutchman event at the 1960 Summer Olympics.

References

External links
 
 

1926 births
2004 deaths
American male sailors (sport)
Olympic sailors of the United States
Sailors at the 1960 Summer Olympics – Flying Dutchman
Sportspeople from Long Branch, New Jersey
Sportspeople from Monmouth County, New Jersey